The coat of arms of Astana, the capital of Kazakhstan, was originally adopted on 5 June 2008, with it being readopted on 13 September 2022 after the city changed its name after the President of Kazakhstan Kassym-Jomart Tokayev signed a constitutional amendment to revert to the name Astana.

Overview
The emblem features a shanyrak (Kazakh:), which features the upper dome-like portion of a yurt and is a symbol seen throughout Kazakh history and culture. It is a modern day symbol of the country, which also features on various other flags and symbols in Kazakhstan, with it being in the blue and yellow colours that feature on the national flag of Kazakhstan.

It also has a red border with the name of the city written on the bottom of the coat of arms. As part of the language romanisation campaign undertaken by the Kazakh government since 2018, the new emblem still features the city's name in cyrillic script (Астана), rather than the latin script (Astana). In 2023, the coat of arms written in the Latin alphabet began to be used.

History 
The current emblem is based on the one adopted in 1998 along with the city flag, at the 16th session of the Maslihat of Astana in 1998. In 2019 the city was renamed from Astana to Nur-Sultan. As the city name features on both the emblem and city flag, both insignia were updated to the new name in 2019.

Under the Russian Empire, the coat of arms featured a stylized castle on a turquoise shield. That design had several variations, with one featuring leaves, while the other featured ears of cereal. The crown also varied, with one version using a monarchical crown, while the other used a mural crown.

During Soviet era, the city was known as Tselinograd. It was primarily represented by a "full hands" design, which symbolized agriculture. 

After the dissolution of the Soviet Union, the city was renamed from Teslinograd to Akmola and later to Astana. For the first few years after becoming the capital of an independent Kazakhstan, the city did not have an official coat of arms. Instead, it used an unofficial design featuring a medieval wall and ancient warlord superimposed on a blue shield. 

The emblem the city used between 1998–2008 showed a mythical creature standing in front of a medieval fortification, flanked by ears of wheat.

The city was briefly renamed from Astana to Nur-Sultan in 2019 after the resignation of long-time former President of Kazakhstan Nursultan Nazarbayev. This meant that the flag and coat of arms were changed on 3 May 2019 to include the name Nur-Sultan in a Latin script. However, when the city's name changed back to Astana on 13 September 2022, it reinstated the 2008 version of the flag and coat of arms with the name Astana in a Cyrillic script. In January 2023, the version written in Latin letters began to be used.

Gallery

Notes

External links
 Coat of arms of Astana

Coat of arms
Astana
2008 establishments in Kazakhstan